In enzymology, an agmatinase is an enzyme that catalyzes the chemical reaction

agmatine + H2O  putrescine + urea

Thus, the two substrates of this enzyme are agmatine and H2O, whereas its two products are putrescine and urea.

This enzyme belongs to the family of hydrolases, those acting on carbon-nitrogen bonds other than peptide bonds, specifically in linear amidines. The systematic name of this enzyme class is agmatine amidinohydrolase. Other names in common use include agmatine ureohydrolase, and SpeB. This enzyme participates in urea cycle and metabolism of amino groups.

Genetics

In humans, the enzyme is encoded by the AGMAT gene.

Structural studies

Inhibitors
 Piperazine-1-carboxamidine

References

External links
 

EC 3.5.3
Enzymes of known structure